Great Spirit may refer to:

Religion and mythology 
 Great Spirit, an English translation of various synonyms in the languages of North American native tribes for the common concept of a universal spiritual force. These include:
 Unetlanvhi in Cherokee mythology
 Wakan Tanka in Lakota tradition
 Gitche Manitou in Algonquian tradition
 Great Spirit in mythologies of the indigenous peoples of the Americas
 Manitou in Algonquian tradition
 God, the Supreme Being and the principal object of faith in a variety of traditions

Geographical
 Waconda Spring, a place in Kansas translated as "Great Spirit" spring
 Moniteau County, Missouri, a county named after Algonquian Manitou
 Big Manitou Falls, English translation of Gitchee Manitou, a waterfall in Wisconsin

Other
 Appeal to the Great Spirit, a 1909 equestrian statue by Cyrus Dallin, located in front of the Boston Museum of Fine Arts on the Huntington Avenue side
 Holy Book of the Great Invisible Spirit, a formerly lost Coptic gospel
 "Great Spirit", a 2016 song by Armin van Buuren vs Vini Vici featuring Hilight Tribe.

See also
 Spirit of God (disambiguation)
 Wakanda (disambiguation)